Public holidays celebrated in Spain include a mix of religious (Roman Catholic), national and regional observances. Each municipality is allowed to have a maximum of 14 public holidays per year; a maximum of nine of these are chosen by the national government and at least two are chosen locally, including patronal festivals.

If one of the "national holidays" happens to fall on a Sunday the regional governments — the autonomous communities of Spain — can choose an alternate holiday or they can allow local authorities to choose. In practice, except for holidays falling on a Sunday, the regional governments can choose up to three holidays per year; or they can choose fewer to allow for more options at the local level.

A puente (bridge) is sometimes made between weekends and holidays that fall on Tuesday or Thursday. The puente will then create a long weekend.

Since 2010, Ceuta and Melilla, both autonomous cities of Spain, have declared the Muslim holiday of Eid al-Adha or Feast of the Sacrifice, as an official public holiday. It was the first time a non-Christian religious festival has been officially celebrated in Spain since the Reconquista.

Some workers take a day off to join a weekend and a holiday into a long weekend.

Current Spanish holidays

The following table lists the holidays for the year 2023:

References

External links
 National and regional holidays in Spain from an expatriate perspective
 Madrid Public holidays National & regional
 Public Holidays in Barcelona
 Public Holidays in Spain 2020

 
Spain
Holidays